Weldon Hicks was a farmer, judge and state legislator in Mississippi. He was born in Virginia. He served as a Justice of the Peace and represented Hinds County, Mississippi in the Mississippi House of Representatives in 1874, 1875, and 1878. He was documented as having been illiterate.

He lived in Edwards, Mississippi.

See also
African-American officeholders during and following the Reconstruction era

References

Year of birth missing
American farmers
19th-century American politicians
19th-century American judges